Ode to Super is an album by American saxophonist Jackie McLean featuring Gary Bartz recorded in 1973 and released on the SteepleChase label.

Reception
The Allmusic review by Scott Yanow awarded the album 2½ stars and stated "This matchup between altoists Jackie McLean and Gary Bartz has always been a bit of a disappointment with the solos much stronger than the material ...A more suitable encore by the two greats is long overdue".

Track listing
 "Monks Dance" (Gary Bartz) - 6:32
 "Ode to Super" (Billy Gault) - 8:20 		
 "Great Rainstreet Blues" (Jackie McLean) - 10:10
 "Watercircle" (Thomas Clausen) - 10:50 		
 "Watercircle" [Take 6] (Clausen) - 5:37 Bonus track on CD reissue
 "Red Cross" (Charlie Parker) - 7:45
 "Red Cross" [Take 1] (Parker) - 12:01 Bonus track on CD reissue

Personnel
Jackie McLean, Gary Bartz – alto saxophone, vocals
Thomas Clausen – piano
Bo Stief – bass
Alex Riel – drums

References

SteepleChase Records albums
Jackie McLean albums
1973 albums